The Generic Model Organism Database (GMOD) project provides biological research communities with a toolkit of open-source software components for visualizing, annotating, managing, and storing biological data. The GMOD project is funded by the United States National Institutes of Health, National Science Foundation and the USDA Agricultural Research Service.

History

The GMOD project was started in the early 2000s as a collaboration between several model organism databases (MODs) who shared a need to create similar software tools for processing data from sequencing projects. MODs, or organism-specific databases, describe genome and other information about important experimental organisms in the life sciences and capture the large volumes of data and information being generated by modern biology. Rather than each group designing their own software, four major MODs--FlyBase, Saccharomyces Genome Database, Mouse Genome Database, and WormBase—worked together to create applications that provide functionality needed by all MODs, such as software to help manage the data within the MOD, and to help users access and query the data.

The GMOD project works to keep software components interoperable. To this end, many of the tools use a common input/output file format or run off a Chado schema database.

Chado database schema
The Chado schema aims to cover many of the classes of data frequently used by modern biologists, from genetic data to phylogenetic trees to publications to organisms to microarray data to IDs to RNA/protein expression. Chado makes extensive use of controlled vocabularies to type all entities in the database; for example: genes, transcripts, exons, transposable elements, etc., are stored in a feature table, with the type provided by Sequence Ontology. When a new type is added to the Sequence Ontology, the feature table requires no modification, only an update of the data in the database. The same is largely true of analysis data that can be stored in Chado as well.

The existing core modules of Chado are:
sequence - for sequences/features
cv - for controlled-vocabs/ontologies
general - currently just dbxrefs
organism - taxonomic data
pub - publication and references
companalysis - augments sequence module with computational analysis data
map - non-sequence maps
genetic - genetic and phenotypic data
expression - gene expression
natural diversity - population data

Software 

The full list of GMOD software components is found on the GMOD Components page.  These components include:

Participating databases

The following organism databases are contributing to and/or adopting GMOD components for model organism databases.

Related projects
Bioperl, BioJava, Biopython, BioRuby, etc.
Ensembl
Gene Ontology
DAS
Genomics Unified Schema
Manatee: Manual Annotation Tool
Biocurator.org
Open Biomedical Ontologies
Sequence Ontology Project

See also
Biological database
Genome project
Genomics
Genome

References

External links
GMOD website

Model organism databases
Genomics
Bioinformatics software